Corallorhiza striata is a species of orchid known by the common names striped coralroot and hooded coralroot. This flowering plant is widespread across much of southern Canada, the northern and western United States, and Mexico.  It lives in dry, decaying plant matter on the ground in pine and mixed coniferous forests, and it obtains its nutrients from fungi via mycoheterotrophy.

Description 

Like other coralroot orchids, the plant takes its name from its coral-shaped rhizomes. The leaves lack chlorophyll and are reduced to colourless scales that sheath the stem. The plant also lacks roots, and relies upon parasitism of fungi for sustenance.

The stem is topped by a raceme of 15 to 25 orchid flowers. Each flower is an open array of sepals and similar-looking petals that may be pink or yellowish and have darker pink or maroon stripes. Inside the flower is a column formed from the fusion of male and female parts, which may be spotted with purple or red. The fruit is a capsule one or two centimeters long.

See also 
 Corallorhiza maculata

References

External links 

 Jepson Manual Treatment
 

striata
Orchids of Canada
Orchids of the United States
Flora of the Great Lakes region (North America)
Flora of the North-Central United States
Flora of the Western United States
Flora of the Sierra Nevada (United States)
Flora without expected TNC conservation status